The men's marathon event at the 1998 Commonwealth Games was held on 20 September in Kuala Lumpur.

Results

References

Marathon
1998
Comm
1998 Commonwealth Games